The 1954–55 Maccabi Tel Aviv season was the club's 49th season since its establishment, in 1906, and 7th since the establishment of the State of Israel.

During the season, the club competed in Liga Alef (top division) and the State Cup. In addition, the club played in the privately organized Shapira Cup, a four-club league competition and took tours to Italy and England (the later while being billed as Maccabi Israel).

Review and events
 On August 1954, Maccabi Tel Aviv departed for a tour of Italy, intending to play Lazio, Torino, Roma and Napoli. However, the matches against Torino and Roma were cancelled, and the team returned home after playing just two matches in Italy, drawing 0–0 with Lazio and losing 1–7 to Napoli, and one more match, en route home, a 1–1 draw against RC Paris, which was Ernst Happel's first match for RC Paris.
 A Maccabi XI, composed of the best players affiliated with Maccabi clubs, most of them from Maccabi Tel Aviv, took a tour of England between 21 October and 7 November 1954. Maccabi lost all four matches during the tour, including a 0–10 defeat to Wolves and was criticized heavily for arranging the tour and the pick of its opponents.
 During December 1954 and January 1955, as no league matches were played due to a dispute between Hapoel, Maccabi and Beitar factions in the IFA, Hapoel Tel Aviv organized a league competition for the top Tel Aviv teams, Hapoel, Maccabi, Beitar and Maccabi Jaffa. The competition was played as a double round-robin tournament, with the top placed team winning the cup, named after former Hapoel Tel Aviv treasurer, Yosef Shapira. Maccabi Tel Aviv won four matches and lost two, finishing second.
 In early May 1955, Brazilian team Associação Atlética Portuguesa visited Israeli, playing three matches, the first of which against Maccabi Tel Aviv. The Brazilians beat Maccabi 3–0, and a joint Maccabi-Hapoel team 4–0.

Match results

Legend

Liga Alef
 
League matches began on 6 February 1955, and by the time the season, only 20 rounds of matches were completed, delaying the end of the league season to the next season.

League table (as of 2 July 1955)

Matches

Results by match

State Cup

Shapira Cup

League table

Results

References

 

Maccabi Tel Aviv F.C. seasons
Maccabi Tel Aviv